USS Escatawpa (AOG-27) was a Mettawee-class gasoline tanker in service with the United States Navy from 1944 to 1946. In 1947, she was sold to Standard Oil tanker where she served as M/T Esso Porto Alegre until she sank in 1970.

History
Escatawpa was launched by the East Coast Shipyard, Inc., Bayonne, New Jersey, on 3 June 1944 and commissioned on 18 August 1944.

1944-1947 
She was assigned to the U.S. Pacific Fleet, operating thereafter in fueling ships and craft on an inter-island circuit in the central Pacific Ocean. A typhoon drove her aground at Kagoshima Kaiwan on 17 September 1945. She was refloated on 10 October and returned to San Francisco, California, where she was placed out of commission on 20 March 1946 and subsequently transferred to the Maritime Commission for lay up in the National Defense Reserve Fleet.

1947-1970
She was sold for commercial service in April 1947 to Standard Oil of Brazil where she served as  M/T Esso Porto Alegre until she sank in 1970.

Military awards and honors 
Escatawpa’s crew was eligible for the following medals:
 American Campaign Medal
 Asiatic-Pacific Campaign Medal
 World War II Victory Medal

References

External links 
 NavSource Online: Service Ship Photo Archive - USS Escatawpa (AOG-27)

 

Mettawee-class gasoline tankers
Type T1-M-A2 tankers of the United States Navy
Ships built in Bayonne, New Jersey
1944 ships
World War II auxiliary ships of the United States